Ahmed Fahti Mohamed Hashad (born July 8, 1927) is an Egyptian former diver. He competed at the 1952 Summer Olympics.

References 

Egyptian male divers
Olympic divers of Egypt
Divers at the 1952 Summer Olympics
1927 births
Living people